The Azadi Indoor Stadium, officially named Azadi 12,000 Capacity Hall, is an indoor sports arena in Tehran, Iran. The stadium has a seating capacity of 6,583, and the stadium capacity with standing room is 12,000. This indoor stadium is located within the Azadi Sport Complex. It is mainly used for volleyball, wrestling and futsal matches, but occasionally basketball games are played here.
Azadi Indoor Stadium is house Iran national volleyball team. Azadi still hosted FIVB Volleyball World League.
Azadi Indoor Stadium hosted the 2014 FILA Wrestling World Cup.

References

External links

Photo of arena

Indoor arenas in Iran
Sports venues in Tehran
Basketball venues in Iran
Volleyball venues in Iran
Sports venues completed in 1974
1974 establishments in Iran